The Comic Art Professional Society (CAPS) is an organization of professional cartoonists in the United States. 
The organization's stated primary purposes are "to advance the ideals and standards of professional cartooning in its many forms", "to promote and foster a social, cultural and intellectual interchange among professional cartoonists of all types" and "to stimulate and encourage interest in and acceptance of the art of cartooning by aspiring cartoonists, students and the general public."

History
The Society was founded in June 1977 when cartoonists Sergio Aragones of Mad Magazine, Don Rico of Marvel Comics, and writer Mark Evanier sought to create a non-profit monthly social group for fellow members of the profession. They enjoyed each other's company and decided to meet on a regular basis. Membership is limited to established professional cartoonists, with a few exceptions of outstanding persons in affiliated fields. CAPS is not a guild or labor union. Charter members of the organization included Jack Kirby, Scott Shaw!, and William Stout. Stout created the CAPS logo based after the logo of the Steve Canyon newspaper comic strip.

"a non-profit social-type group that will meet every month. A great many of us toil in near isolation, utterly unaware of what (and who) is happening in our field. The primary goal of CAPS is to change that.” - From the original CAPS invitation

The membership meets the second Thursday of every month to discuss happenings in the comic art business, market news, state-of-the-industry reports, and often hear from guest speakers who are at the top of their profession. CAPS exists for cartoonists and writers to interact on a social basis. CAPS hosts other special events through the year that have included picnics, art auctions, Christmas parties, and an annual banquet at which an esteemed member of the comic art profession is honored with The Sergio Award. CAPS is not a fan organization.

Today, the 2022-2023 CAPS Board of Directors includes President: Christie Shinn, Vice-President: Bradley C. Rader, Treasurer: Jim MacQuarrie, and Secretary: Jose Pimienta.

Charitable causes
The CAPS membership has often contributed their talents to various philanthropic endeavors, such as auctions of original artwork for charity. Many times this has included raising money to assist cartoonists in need.

In 1980, CAPS was involved in donating art to benefit Childrens Hospital of Los Angeles.

In 2010, CAPS hosted an art auction to benefit veteran comic artists Russ Heath and Ralph Reese.

In May 2012, CAPS hosted an original art auction to benefit the Hairy Cell Leukemia Foundation in remembrance of comic artist Dave Stevens. 

In 2014 CAPS hosted a series of original art auctions to benefit comic artist Stan Sakai and his wife with medical bills.

CAPS also collaborated with Dark Horse Comics on an oversized, 160 page hardcover benefit book The Sakai Project: Artists celebrate 30 years of Usagi Yojimbo.

Sergio Award 
The organization hosts an annual banquet to honor an esteemed member of the profession and present their highest award for lifetime achievement, The Sergio, named after one of CAPS' co-founders Sergio Aragones. The earliest recipients of the honor received a printed award certificate, with later year's honorees receiving an award plaque. In 2006, CAPS officially gave a name to the honor – The Sergio Award - and began giving an award statue crafted in Aragones' cartoon likeness. The Sergio award statue was sculpted by Rubén Procopio.

Honorees
 1983 Arthur Lake
 1984 Clarence (Ducky) Nash
 1985 Toon Voice Actors: Margaret Kerry, June Foray, Bill Scott, Daws Butler, Gary Owens
 1986  Dr. Demento (Barry Hansen) 
 1995 Will Eisner 
 1996 Jonathan Winters
 1997 Dan Spiegle
 1998 Bill Melendez, Zeke Zekley
 1999 Roger Armstrong
 2000 Mell Lazarus
 2001 Kelly Freas
 2002 Stan Freberg
 2003 Ray Bradbury
 2005 Jerry Robinson
 2006 Jack Davis, Sergio Aragones
 2007 Stan Lee
 2008 Bil Keane 
 2009 Gene Colan
 2010 Russ Heath 
 2011 Al Jaffee  
 2013 Floyd Norman  
 2016 Drew Struzan 
 2017 Roy Thomas
 2019 Lynn Johnston

Don Rico Award 
Started by former CAPS president Tone Rodriguez and originally called the Scott Shaw Award, awarded for a member who goes above and beyond to support CAPS. Shaw requested the award be renamed to honor Don Rico.

Honorees
 2008 Jim MacQuarrie
 2009 Stephen & Heidi Silver (Scott Shaw Award)
 2010 Jim MacQuarrie
 2012 Steve Wyatt
 2016 Lonnie Millsap 
 2017 Travis Hanson
 2018 Brad Rader

See also

Daily comic strip
Comic Books
Cartoon Art Museum
San Diego Comic-Con

References

External links
CAPS - Comic Art Professional Society

Cartooning
Comics groups and collectives
Comics-related organizations
American artist groups and collectives
1977 establishments in the United States
Arts organizations established in 1977